Rohan Mathew Sebastian (born March 14, 1991) is an artistic gymnast who has represented Ireland at numerous World Championships and European Championships.  He is the first Irish gymnast to qualify to the World University Games and also competed at the first ever European Games governed by the European Olympic Committees (EOC). He was also a member of the two-time National Champion Michigan Wolverines men's gymnastics team.

Early life 
Sebastian was born in Belfast, Northern Ireland to parents Anthony and Veronique, both physicians educated in India. He grew up in Oklahoma City, Oklahoma where he attended Bart Conner Gymnastics Academy training under World Champion and Olympic gymnast Ivan Ivankov. Holding dual U.S. and Irish citizenship, he first represented Ireland at the 2008 European Championships in Lausanne, Switzerland. Sebastian signed with the University of Michigan in 2009. As a freshman in 2010, he earned Michigan's first ever Big Ten Freshman of the Week award and helped lead Michigan to an NCAA Division 1 team championship as the lead off gymnast in the final rotation. He was elected co-captain of the Michigan men's gymnastics team as a senior and led the team to another NCAA Team Championship and Big Ten Conference team championship, alongside US Olympian Samuel Mikulak.

References

External links 
 Rohan Sebastian at Federation Internationale de Gymnastique

1991 births
Living people
Irish male artistic gymnasts
European Games competitors for Ireland
Gymnasts at the 2015 European Games
Michigan Wolverines men's gymnasts